Adherbal roy de Numidie is a tragedy by French dramatist François Joseph Lagrange-Chancel (1677–1758) who gave the first presentation of this work on 8 January 1694 when he was 16. It is based on the life of Adherbal, King of Numidia from 118 to 112 BC. It was translated into Dutch by Rudolph Marcus in 1759 under the title Jugurtha.

See also
17th-century French literature
Theatre of France

External links 
 Adherbal roy de Numidie on data.bnf.fr
 Adherbal roy de Numidie

1694 plays
French plays
Plays set in the 2nd century BC